Michael G. Polk Jr. is an American comedian, actor, TV commentator, and newspaper columnist, known primarily for his sketch comedy and viral videos.

Early life and education
Polk was born in Warren, Ohio. After being raised in Newton Falls, Ohio, he attended Kent State University as an undergraduate and earned a degree in communications and psychology in 2002.

Career 
Polk created the YouTube series Runaway Box / Man in the Box. His work has also appeared on HBO, Cinemax and TNT's Inside the NBA.

He sang his YouTube song "One Semester of Spanish - Love Song" for Kim Kardashian on Spanish television channel Telemundo.  That video has received over 9.4 million views on YouTube.  He thanked his viewers as "Spanish Mike" when the video hit 2 Million views.

Some of his other work includes "Ooh Girl!" - An Honest R&B Song", "The Great Office War", "The Factory of Sadness" and two different versions of a "Hastily Made Cleveland Tourism Video" all of which have about 20 million views combined on YouTube.  The tourism spoof video actually prompted Cleveland's convention and tourism bureau to solicit other videos in a 'counterattack' to Polk's not-so-flattering work. Segments of the Cleveland tourism videos were also featured in the Michael Moore documentary film Capitalism: A Love Story.

In 2012, Polk became a weekly contributor on The Rizzo Show - a Sunday night sports/comedy program airing WJW channel 8 in Cleveland (the local FOX affiliate). Polk also contributed to the sports section of the nightly news broadcast with Browns Hangover, a recurring segment providing comedic commentary after Cleveland Browns games.

Polk has also worked for Funny or Die and his current comedy troupe Last Call Cleveland.

In 2016, Polk became a writer for the Cleveland Plain Dealer, doing periodic columns about pop culture and humor.

In 2019, Cleveland NBC affiliate WKYC channel 3 hired Polk as a feature reporter and contributor, that same year - with the 2019 MLB All-Star Game occurring in Cleveland - ESPN solicited Polk to make a third "Hastily Made Tourism Video" for Cleveland, which he released on July 9, 2019.

Awards
Polk was named as one of Cleveland Magazine's Most Interesting People of 2010.

In 2013 readers of Scene Magazine voted him to be Cleveland's Best Local Comedian and Best Local Author for his book Damn Right I'm From Cleveland.

in 2022, Polk won three Lower Great Lakes Emmy Awards in various categories in his role as commentator/host on WKYC.

Bibliography
Damn Right I'm From Cleveland (2012 )

References

External links

 
 https://www.youtube.com/user/mikepolkjunior

American male film actors
American stand-up comedians
American male television actors
American male voice actors
Kent State University alumni
Living people
Male actors from Cleveland
People from Warren, Ohio
People from Newton Falls, Ohio
Year of birth missing (living people)